The Topolnitsa is a river in southern Bulgaria, an important left tributary of the Maritsa. It takes its source from Bich Peak in Sredna Gora close to Koprivshtitsa; it is known as the Shirineyska in its upper course. The Topolnitsa flows into the Maritsa near Pazardzhik after making a large turn under Trakiya motorway. Among the Topolnitsa's tributaries are the Mativir and the Bunovo River. The river's name is derived from the Bulgarian word топола, topola ("poplar").

References

 

Rivers of Bulgaria
Landforms of Sofia Province
Landforms of Pazardzhik Province